Marasmarcha bajanica is a moth of the family Pterophoridae. It is found in Mongolia (Bajan).

The wingspan is about 14 mm. The forewings are greyish brown. Adults are on wing in July.

References

Moths described in 2003
Exelastini